Oltedal is a village in Gjesdal municipality in Rogaland county, Norway. The lake Oltedalsvatnet lies on the southwestern edge of the village. Oltedal Church is located in the village. The village has some small industries such as yarn making, chemicals, and sand/gravel pits.

References

Villages in Rogaland
Gjesdal